The Poor People's Alliance is a network of radical grassroots movements in South Africa. It was formed in 2008 after the Action Alliance, formed in December 2006, was expanded to include two more organisations.

The following organisations were members of the alliance:

Abahlali baseMjondolo in the province of KwaZulu-Natal.
Abahlali baseMjondolo in the province of the Western Cape.
The Landless People's Movement in the province of Gauteng.
The Western Cape Anti-Eviction Campaign in the province of the Western Cape.
The Rural Network of KwaZulu-Natal.

The Poor People's Alliance refused electoral politics and resolved to boycott the 2009 national elections under the slogan "No Land! No House! No Vote!".

The Poor People's Alliance supported the struggle of the eMacambini Community against mass eviction by Ruwaad Holdings and KwaZulu-Natal Premier S'bu Ndebele and the African National Congress Provincial Government of KwaZulu-Natal.

International links

The Chicago Anti-Eviction Campaign stated that it has been influenced by the Western Cape Anti-Eviction Campaign and the Poor People's Alliance.

Notes and references

Social movements in South Africa
Homelessness organizations
Housing in South Africa
Shack dwellers' movements
Affordable housing advocacy organizations
Political advocacy groups in South Africa
Squatters' movements
Defunct social movements in South Africa